Ini Utharam is a 2022 Indian Malayalam-language Thriller film directed by Sudheesh Ramachandran and written by Ranjith Unni. Produced by A&V Entertainment, starring Aparna Balamurali, Kalabhavan Shajohn, Harish Uthaman, Siddique, Chandunath G Nair, Jaffar Idukki, Siddharth Menon. The film's music is directed by Hesham Abdul Wahab and Ravi Chandran handles cinematography. The film released to mixed to positive reviews.

Plot 
A woman who confesses to a murder claims that the investigating inspector is her accomplice. However, at the crime scene, the suspense intensifies with an unexpected twist.

Cast 
 Aparna Balamurali as Janaki Ganesh 
 Harish Uthaman as SP Ilavarasan 
 Kalabhavan Shajohn as CI Karunan a.k.a Kakka Karunan 
 Siddique as Home Minister Varakala Dineshan 
 Chandunath G Nair as SI Prashanth Varma 
 Jaffar Idukki as Paster Prakashan 
 Siddharth Menon as Ashwin

Music 
The music of the film is directed by Hesham Abdul Wahab and lyrics is done by Vinayak Sasikumar.

References